The Rohachyk river (Ukrainian: Рогачик) is a left tributary of the Dnieper river in Kherson oblast, Ukraine. It has a length of 41 km. The river valley is up to 200 m wide. The width is generally 5 m. There are several ponds on the river. It names derives from a Ukrainian word for the "horn" as the river is winding.

The Rohachyk river rises in the southern outskirts of the urban-type settlement of Verkhnii Rohachyk. It flows through the territory of Kakhovka Raion of Kherson Oblast. The mouth area of the river 7 km in length creates Nyzhniy (Lower) Rohachyk estuary which is separated from the Dnieper by Kakhovka Reservoir dam.

There are three unnamed left tributaries.

The river flows through such settlements as: Verkhnii Rohachyk, Novooleksiivka, Trudovyk, Zoria, Heorhiivka, Oleksiivka, Prolatarii.

References 

Rivers of Kherson Oblast